Kenneth Skoglund (born 21 July 1953) is a Norwegian sport shooter. He was born in Eidskog. He competed in 50 metre running target at the 1976 and 1984 Summer Olympics.

References

External links

1953 births
Living people
People from Eidskog
Norwegian male sport shooters
Olympic shooters of Norway
Shooters at the 1976 Summer Olympics
Shooters at the 1984 Summer Olympics
Sportspeople from Innlandet
20th-century Norwegian people